Pioneer Christian Academy was a college preparatory school in Whites Creek, Tennessee. It was a non-denominational Christian school. In 2006, it had 220 students from pre-kindergarten to twelfth grade.  The school closed in 2009.

History
Pioneer Christian Academy was founded in 1969 by Dr. J. Frank Bruce. of land was soon donated in the Whites Creek area. Dr. Bruce was instrumental in the founding of many other local Christian schools in the state of Tennessee.

In 1972, the IRS revoked the school's tax exempt status because the school failed to document that it had a racially non-discriminatory admissions policy.

In 1980, Rosemark Academy was forced to cancel a football game at Pioneer Christian Academy because Pioneer Christian administrators felt that the Rosemark Academy cheerleader's uniforms were too revealing.

Campus
In 2014, the former campus was sold to Jonathan Edwards Classical Academy.

Athletics

The Pioneer Christian Academy Buffaloes athletic teams competed in the Tennessee Athletic Association of Christian Schools. The Middle Tennessee region of the TAACS is the Middle Tennessee Christian Athletic Association, or the MTCAA.

State championships
Varsity Volleyball State Champions(9): 1979, 1980, 1986, 1987, 1988, 1989, 1990, 1991, 1992.
Varsity Football State Champions(5): 1976, 1977, 1978, 1979, 1980.
Varsity Boys Basketball State Champions(9): 1975, 1976, 1977, 1978, 1980, 1986, 1988, 1990, 2007.
Varsity Girls Basketball State Champions(3): 1978, 1980, 1981.
Varsity Baseball State Champions(2): 1977, 1978.

MTCAA Varsity Conference Championships
Varsity Volleyball(11): 1979, 1984, 1987, 1988, 1990, 1991, 1993, 1999,  2000, 2001, 2002.
Varsity Soccer(5): 1985, 1986, 1987, 1988, 1995.
Varsity Girls Basketball(5): 1982, 1983, 1984, 1986, 1990.
Varsity Boys Basketball(13): 1980, 1981, 1982, 1984, 1985, 1986, 1987, 1988, 1990, 1996, 1997, 1999, 2007.

MTCAA Varsity Tournament Champions
Varsity Volleyball(6): 1983, 1989, 1990, 1991, 1992, 2002.
Varsity Girls Basketball(6): 1976, 1982, 1985, 1986, 1990, 1993.
Varsity Boys Basketball(9): 1982, 1984, 1985, 1986, 1987, 1988, 1998, 2000, 2007.

Notable alummi 

 Eddie Gossage, Texas Motor Speedway president and track promoter

References

External links
Official website

Educational institutions established in 1969
Tennessee Association of Christian Schools
Schools in Davidson County, Tennessee
Private K-12 schools in Tennessee
1969 establishments in Tennessee
Defunct schools in Tennessee
Defunct Christian schools in the United States
2009 disestablishments in Tennessee
Segregation academies in Tennessee